The  is a DC electric multiple unit (EMU) commuter and suburban train type operated by East Japan Railway Company (JR East). The commuter variant was introduced on Yamanote Line services in November 2015, and the suburban variant entered service on the Sōbu Rapid and Yokosuka Lines on 21 December 2020.

Design features 
The E235 series design was developed from the earlier E233 series trains, and like the E233 and E231 series trains, the new E235 series trains have stainless steel bodies. The exterior styling was overseen by the industrial design firm Ken Okuyama Design. Baggage racks and hand-holds have been lowered  for easier access and the seats are  wider than previous trains. The car interiors also have up to 36 digital monitors for various informational displays. The window behind the drivers cab has been lowered so children can get a better view of the operator of the cars. The temperature of each car is also monitored; the system can predict the number of passengers at upcoming stations and adjust the temperature for passenger comfort. This information is also communicated to a smart phone application, allowing customers to choose in which car to ride based on their temperature preference. In 2017, the E235 series received the Laurel Prize.

Variants 
  E235-0 series: 11-car sets used on the Yamanote Line
  E235-1000 series: 11+4-car sets used on Yokosuka Line and Sōbu Rapid Line, with through services to the Narita Line, Sotobō Line, Uchibō Line, Kashima Line, and Sōbu Main Line

History 
Details of the E235 series design were first announced in July 2014. The first, pre-series set 01, train was delivered from the J-TREC factory at Akiha-ku, Niigata in March 2015, with test-running commencing on the Yamanote Line on 30 March.

Set number 01 entered revenue service on 30 November 2015, with a departure ceremony at Osaki Station, but was taken out of service later the same day following faults with door-close indicators and problems stopping at the correct position along the station platform. Test running on the Yamanote Line resumed from 27 December. The train returned to revenue service on the Yamanote Line on 7 March 2016.

In June 2016, JR East announced its official plans for the introduction of a fleet of 49 full-production sets (539 vehicles) between spring 2017 and spring 2020. Most units would be built as 10-car sets and use converted former E231-500 series SaHa E231-4600 cars, while two units would be built as 11-car sets. The first full-production standard set, 02, was delivered from the J-TREC factory in Niigata in April 2017. This entered service on 22 May 2017.

In April 2018, JR East announced the replacement of the existing E217 series on the Sōbu Line (Rapid) and Yokosuka Line by new E235 series trains beginning in fiscal 2020. The fleet will consist of 51 11-car trains and 46 four-car trains, for a total of 745 cars to be newly constructed. The first train entered service on 21 December 2020.

E235-0 series 

A total of 50 11-car trains were delivered for use on the Yamanote Line, replacing the E231-500 series in use since 2002. A pre-series train was delivered in March 2015, first entering revenue service from 30 November 2015, but then taken out of service for three months before re-entering service in March 2016.

The pre-series set (01) was converted to the full production standard by 14 March 2018.

Formations 
, 50 11-car sets (01–50) are based at Tokyo General Rolling Stock Centre and formed with six motored ("M") cars and five non-powered trailer ("T") cars. All but two sets have SaHa E235-4600 cars (Car 10), which are modified from former E231-500 series SaHa E231-4600 cars.

 On the pre-series set (01), car 3 has one PS33D single-arm pantograph, car 6 has PS33H and PS36A single-arm pantographs (one used as a backup), and car 9 has one PS33H single-arm pantograph.
 On the remaining production sets (02-50), cars 3 and 9 each have one PS33H single-arm pantograph and car 6 has two PS33H single-arm pantographs (one used as a backup).
 All cars have an accessible/priority "free space".
 Car 4 is designated as a mildly air-conditioned car.

Exterior

Interior 
Priority seating is provided at both ends of each car (except in end cars), and a space for wheelchairs or strollers is provided at one end of each car. LED lighting is used throughout. The initial plan was for paper advertisements inside the cars to be completely abolished, replaced by 18 LCD colour advertising screens in each car, but following feedback from advertising companies and users, the first train to enter service will include traditional paper advertisements in addition to the LCD screens.

The full-production sets (02 onward) incorporate a number of design changes. The handrails next to seats in the full-production sets have an embossed surface compared with the polished metal surface used in the pre-series set.

SaHa E235-500/-4600 series cars 

The car 10 position on the E235-0 series trains has a slightly different door spacing, to more closely align with the driver cab of 10-car Keihin–Tōhoku Line trains, which sometimes have to share platforms with Yamanote Line trains during track maintenance. In 48 of the 50 sets, car 10 is a SaHa E235-4600 series car, and externally appear different from the other cars. These cars were originally built in 2010–2011 as SaHa E231-4600 series cars (and were built to E233 series standards), and were modified to E235 specifications when the E231-500 series was withdrawn from the Yamanote Line. The remaining two sets, sets 4 and 5, have a new build SaHa E235-500 series car in the car 10 position, in order to allow for a more reasonable 90-day timeframe for modification works on the remaining cars (as it would have been difficult to perform the modifications in 45 days).

Special liveries 
In October 2022, set 15 was repainted into an all-over black livery to commemorate the 150th anniversary of the opening of the railway. The Netflix logo also appears on the sides of the carriages. It will remain with this livery until 31 December 2022.

E235-1000 series 

The E235-1000 series fleet will consist of a total of 745 cars (consisting of 51 11-car trains and 46 four-car trains) for use on the Sōbu Line (Rapid) and Yokosuka Line, replacing the E217 series in use since 1994. The fleet was introduced into service on 21 December 2020.

On 21 April 2020, the Green cars of the first set were completed at the J-TREC factory in Kanazawa-ku, Yokohama and transported to the J-TREC factory in Niigata to be joined with standard cars. On 3 June 2020, the first 11-car set was completed at Niigata; it was delivered to Kamakura Depot on 8 June 2020. The first 4-car set was completed at Niigata on 16 June 2020 and was delivered on 19 June 2020.

Formations

11-car sets 
, 16 11-car sets (F-01–F-16) are based at Kamakura Depot and formed with six motored ("M") cars and five non-powered trailer ("T") cars.

 Cars 7 and 10 each have one single-arm pantograph and car 3 has two single-arm pantographs (one used as a backup).
 Cars 1-3 and 6-11 have an accessible/priority "free space".
 Cars 1, 5, and 6 each have a toilet (universal design in cars 1 and 6).
 Car 8 is designated as a mildly air-conditioned car.
 Cars 4 and 5 are bilevel Green Cars.

4-car sets 
, 13 four-car sets (J-01–J-13) are based at Kamakura Depot and formed with two motored ("M") cars and two non-powered trailer ("T") cars.

 Car +3 has two single-arm pantographs (one used as a backup).
 All cars have an accessible/priority "free space".
 Car +1 has a universal design toilet.

Interior 
As with their counterparts on the Yamanote Line, passenger accommodation for ordinary cars consists of longitudinal bench seating throughout. A space for wheelchairs or strollers is provided at one end of each car, except on Green cars. The seats are  wider than those seen in earlier E217 series cars. The information screens measure 21 inches, and display information in multiple languages. LED lighting is used throughout. Surveillance cameras are also equipped in order to increase safety. 

Green car accommodation consists of reclining, 2+2 abreast seating throughout. Also included are power outlets, which are equipped under the seats' armrests.

Notes

References

External links 

 J-TREC press release 

Electric multiple units of Japan
East Japan Railway Company
Train-related introductions in 2015
1500 V DC multiple units of Japan
J-TREC multiple units